The Aspinall Foundation (formerly The John Aspinall Foundation) is a British charity (Registered Charity 326567) which works to promote wildlife conservation. It was set up by casino owner John Aspinall in 1984 and runs the two zoos he established, Port Lympne Wild Animal Park and Howletts Wild Animal Park in Kent, England. It also runs conservation projects overseas to protect endangered species and return captive animals back to the wild. The charity is now run by Damian Aspinall, son of the founder.

In addition to running the zoos, which breed rare and endangered animals, the Foundation campaigns on wildlife issues, such as opposing Chinese attempts to relax the rules governing the trade in products made from tigers. As of 2002, the twin zoos were home to 14 hybrid, Siberian and Sumatran tigers. The Foundation set up a project for gorillas orphaned by bush meat poachers in the Republic of Congo in the late 1980s and in 1998, created an orphan gorilla project in the neighbouring state of Gabon. It supports the 'Project Protection des Gorilles Gabon' which is based in Franceville in Gabon and seeks to reintroduce gorillas in the Batéké Plateau National Park. In 2013 the foundation launched a programme to breed Scottish wildcats, with plans to create a breeding centre on the island of Càrna, off the west coast of Scotland.

In November 2019, The Aspinall Foundation rescued 11 elephants, 19 buffalo, 29 wildebeest and 4 giraffe from Blaauwbosch Private Reserve in South Africa's Eastern Cape after the SPCA were granted a warrant for the animals' removal following years of neglect.

In February 2020 The Aspinall Foundation became the first organisation in the world to send captive bred cheetahs from the UK for rewilding in South Africa. Damian Aspinall personally released the two male cheetah, who were born at Port Lympne, into their new home close to Cape Town.

In March 2021, The Charity Commission announced that they had opened a statutory inquiry into The Aspinall Foundation over serious concerns about the charity’s governance and financial management.  The Guardian reported an item in its accounts in November 2021 suggesting the foundation had paid £150,158 to Victoria Aspinall, the wife of Damian Aspinall, to be used in 2020 as fees for "interior design services". Damian Aspinall was asked to stand down as chairman and trustee in June 2022 over financial irregularities it had discovered during its inquiry, but Aspinall had been granted time to challenge the ruling.

Tara Stoinski of the Dian Fossey Gorilla Fund made this comment on the television program 60 Minutes (aired 15 March 2015): "I think that humans have a very romantic notion of what the wild is like, and the wild is not a place where it is safe, and animals get to roam free and make choices". She wonders about the value of sending zoo-born animals to Africa and believes that it would be wiser for Aspinall to use his funds to save gorillas already in the wild.

In 2022, the Aspinall Foundation announced that 13 elephants, born in captivity, would be returned to Africa, for release in the wilds of Kenya. Some experts questioned the wisdom of this strategy, citing issues such as the stress caused by "a hazardous journey", low temperatures at night in Africa, as well as "unfamiliar surroundings, foraging for food, predators and illness". Some concern was also expressed about water quality and the risk of conflict with the human population. The Foundation replied with a statement that it "has a 30-year history of successful rewilding projects around the globe".

References

External links
The Aspinall Foundation website

BBC Article on the Gabon Gorilla sanctuary
BBC Article on the foundation's work in Congo
Damian Aspinall rescues starving elephants from private game reserve in South Africa

1984 establishments in England
Charities based in Kent
Foreign charities operating in Gabon
Organizations established in 1984
Foreign charities operating in the Republic of the Congo
Animal charities based in the United Kingdom